Jasminum didymum is a species of scrambling vine or low shrub. It is native to insular Southeast Asia from Java to the Philippines, as well as Australia (Northern Territory, Norfolk Island, and all states except Tasmania), as well as some islands in the Pacific (New Guinea, Solomon Islands, Fiji, Niue, New Caledonia and the Society Islands).  Jasminum didymum occurs naturally in habitats from rainforests to arid and semi-arid shrublands.

Subspecies
Jasminum didymum is highly variable in leaf shape and habit and is subdivided into 3 subspecies based on these characteristics:

Jasminum didymum subsp. lineare (R.Br.) P.S.Green  - Mainland Australia
Jasminum didymum subsp. racemosum (F.Muell.) P.S.Green - Queensland only

Etymology
'Jasminum' is a Latinized form of the Arabic word, 'yasemin' for sweetly scented plants.

Images

References

External links
Flora of Australia Online 

didymum
Flora of Queensland
Eudicots of Western Australia
Flora of South Australia
Flora of New South Wales
Flora of Victoria (Australia)
Flora of the Northern Territory
Flora of Norfolk Island
Flora of Malesia
Flora of Papuasia
Flora of Fiji
Flora of New Caledonia
Flora of Niue
Flora of the Society Islands
Plants described in 1786